Čreta may refer to several places in Slovenia:

 Čreta, Hoče–Slivnica, a settlement in the Municipality of Hoče–Slivnica
 Čreta, Vransko, a settlement in the Municipality of Vransko
 Čreta pri Kokarjah, a settlement in the Municipality of Nazarje